The 1927 Arkansas Razorbacks football team represented the University of Arkansas in the Southwest Conference (SWC) during the 1927 college football season. In their sixth year under head coach Francis Schmidt, the Razorbacks compiled an 8–1 record (2–1 against SWC opponents), finished in third place in the SWC, and outscored all opponents by a combined total of 218 to 76. The team's only loss came against Texas A&M by a 40–6 score.

Schedule

References

Arkansas
Arkansas Razorbacks football seasons
Arkansas Razorbacks football